Avery Independent School District is a public school district based in Red River County, Avery, Texas (USA).

Accountability Rating 
In 2021, the district was rated "A" in student achievement, school progress, and closing the gaps; The district was also rated "B" in academic growth.

Schools
In the 2022-2023 school year, the district operated two schools.
Avery Secondary School (Grades 6–12)
Avery Elementary School (Grades PK-5)

Special programs

Athletics
Avery Secondary School participates in the boys' sports of basketball and cross country. The school also participates in the girls' sports of basketball, cross country, and volleyball.

See also

List of school districts in Texas
List of high schools in Texas

References

External links

School districts in Red River County, Texas